Cruz de nadie (Cross of No One) is a Venezuelan telenovela which starred Luis Fernández, Nohely Noriega, Isabel Moreno and Joana Benedek. It was produced and broadcast on Marte TV in 1994.

Synopsis 
Cruz de nadie (Cross of No One) is the story of a forbidden love by the unfortunate laws of inheritance. Framed at the early 20th century, and breathtaking Andes landscapes, this is the story of Augusto Antúnez and Emilia Vegas' fight against the tyrant Teofilo Vegas, Emilia's Father, and their fate, which condemns their love. The fruit of this relationship are two children which are separated from their parents at birth. One of them, Luciano, will suffer the fatal sickness filling Augusto with horror and unable to withstand the pain that Emilia will bear upon seeing the maimed child decides to exchange him for a healthy girl. Maité Antúnez. She will seize their fortune and live surrounded in luxury and comfort that was rightfully the twins. The children are sold to a circus, and are raised as brother without knowing the truth. The second twin, Cruz de nadie, is raised in the circus by Yanina and falls in love with Maité to revive her parents’ story and fulfill the revenge that will clean the past of sin and misdeed.

Cast 
 Luis Fernández as Cruz
 Nohely Noriega as Maité Antúnez
 Julie Restifo as Dolores Vegas
 Joana Benedek as Cinara
 Mario Balmaseda
 Gustavo Rodríguez
 Lourdes Valera
 Mirtha Pérez
 Pedro Renteria
 Carolina Tejera
 Ricardo Álamo
 Martin Lantigua
 Orlando Fundicelli
 Javier Valcarcel
 Pedro Lander
 Betty Ruth
 Pierina Pérez

External links
Cruz de nadie at the Internet Movie Database

1994 telenovelas
Venezuelan telenovelas
1994 Venezuelan television series debuts
1994 Venezuelan television series endings
Spanish-language telenovelas